Heroes in Yellow and Blue (Swedish: Hjältar i gult och blått) is a 1940 Swedish comedy film directed by Schamyl Bauman and starring Thor Modéen, Elof Ahrle and Tollie Zellman. It was shot at the Centrumateljéerna Studios in Stockholm. The film's sets were designed by the art director Arthur Spjuth.

Cast
 Thor Modéen as 	Thor Emanuelsson
 Elof Ahrle as 	Loffe Holm
 Tollie Zellman as 	Fru Delmer
 Barbro Kollberg as Louise, hennes dotter
 Emy Hagman as 	Ulrika, hembiträde
 Sigge Fürst as 'Dr.' Christian Ronzander
 Arne Lindblad as 	Amanuens Lundvall
 Gösta Cederlund as 	Översten
 John Botvid as 	Gustafsson
 Tord Bernheim as 	Drunk Conscript 
 Gunnar Björnstrand as 	Sgt. Kristian 
 Ernst Brunman as 	Non-Commissioned Officer 
 Gustaf Färingborg as Card Player
 Åke Grönberg as 	Soldier 
 Olle Hilding as 	Courtroom Clerk 
 Torsten Hillberg as 	Captain 
 Ivar Kåge as 	Judge 
 Hilmer Peters as 	Rulle 
 Bellan Roos as 	Telephone Operator 
Tom Walter as Card Player 
 Ragnar Widestedt as Captain Lundin

References

Bibliography 
 Per Olov Qvist & Peter von Bagh. Guide to the Cinema of Sweden and Finland. Greenwood Publishing Group, 2000.

External links 
 

1940 films
1940 comedy films
Swedish comedy films
1940s Swedish-language films
Films directed by Schamyl Bauman
Films set in Stockholm
1940s Swedish films